Lago Morto (Italian for "dead lake") is a lake in the Province of Treviso, Veneto, Italy. It has this name because it has no effluent nor surface rivers feeding it, being fed probably by an underground karst river. 

Lakes of Veneto